Onebala semiluna is a moth in the family Gelechiidae. It was described by Anthonie Johannes Theodorus Janse in 1954. It is found in South Africa.

References

Endemic moths of South Africa
Moths described in 1954
Onebala